"Almost" is a song by Canadian singer Tamia. It was written and produced by Shep Crawford for the singer's fourth album Between Friends and released as its third and final single in 2007, reaching number 59 on the US Hot R&B/Hip-Hop Songs chart. The music video for the song was directed by Margaret Malandruccolo, who also shot the video for Tamia's previous single "Me".

Track listing

Credits and personnel 
Credits adapted from the liner notes of Between Friends.

Brian Gardner – mastering
Shalonda Crawford – backing vocals
Shep Crawford – instruments, production, writer
Tamia Hill – vocals, backing vocals
Dexter Simmons – mixing
Mike Sroka – recording
 Isaiah "Zay" Thomas – backing vocals

Charts

References

2006 songs
Tamia songs
Songs written by Shep Crawford
2007 singles
Music videos directed by Margaret Malandruccolo